The Dr. Max Nordau Synagogue, also called Hebrew community Dor Hadash, is located in Villa Crespo, Buenos Aires.

History 
Although the temple was opened in 1955, its history started in 1912, when a group of immigrants coming from a few countries of Eastern Europe, among them there was; Lithuanians, Russians, and Poles, founded a cultural center, near the place where is now the temple Dr. Max Nordau.

In 1923, the synagogue was moved to its current location, the Murillo street, number 665, it was a cheder school there, with 20 students and a teacher. That same year, the congregation changed its name and was called: "Dr. Max Nordau" Hebrew association, named after the zionist leader, and follower of Theodor Herzl.

In 1985, the congregation was called Hebrew community Dor Hadash (in English: new generation). The rituals were modernized, Dor Hadash is a conservative congregation.

References 

1955 establishments in Argentina
Ashkenazi Jewish culture in Argentina
Conservative Judaism in Argentina
Conservative synagogues
European-Argentine culture in Buenos Aires
Jews and Judaism in Buenos Aires
Lithuanian diaspora in South America
Lithuanian-Jewish diaspora
Polish diaspora in South America
Polish-Jewish diaspora
Religious buildings and structures in Buenos Aires
Russian diaspora in South America
Russian-Jewish diaspora
Synagogues in Argentina